Muhammad Zia-ul-Haq (1924–1988) was the sixth president of Pakistan.

Zia-ul-Haq may also refer to:
 Zia-ul-Haq (Afghan cricketer)
 Zia-ul-haq (Afghan cricketer, born 1999)
 Zia-ul-Haq (Pakistani cricketer) (born 1994)